Park Tae-Gyu  (born 21 February 1990) is a Korean football forward.

He previously played with Serbian club FK Bežanija. In summer 2012 he joined Serbian SuperLiga side FK BSK Borča.

References

1990 births
Living people
Footballers from Seoul
Association football forwards
South Korean footballers
FK Bežanija players
FK BSK Borča players
FK Spartak Subotica players
Expatriate footballers in Serbia
South Korean expatriate footballers
South Korean expatriate sportspeople in Serbia